Esad Veledar  (born 4 January 1984) is a former professional footballer who played as a midfielder.

External links

fcdac1904.com

1984 births
Living people
German people of Bosnia and Herzegovina descent
German footballers
Footballers from Munich
Association football midfielders
Slovak Super Liga players
TSV 1860 Munich II players
TSV 1860 Munich players
A.S.D. Martina Calcio 1947 players
Panionios F.C. players
Fehérvár FC players
Budapest Honvéd FC players
FC DAC 1904 Dunajská Streda players
German expatriate footballers
German expatriate sportspeople in Greece
Expatriate footballers in Greece
German expatriate sportspeople in Italy
Expatriate footballers in Italy
German expatriate sportspeople in Hungary
Expatriate footballers in Hungary
German expatriate sportspeople in Slovakia
Expatriate footballers in Slovakia